Setema Gali, Jr. (born July 2, 1976) is a former American football defensive lineman of Samoan descent.

An undrafted free agent out of Brigham Young, Gali was signed by the New England Patriots, where he spent two seasons as a defensive end.

Following his NFL career, Setema was a mortgage broker, real estate investor, hard money lender and a speaker on stages around the country.

As an accomplished musician, Setema accompanied an LDS Gospel Choir Divine Heritage, was a musician for the Polynesian Performing Group Taimane and a keyboard/vocalist for the Reggae Band Mana Poly Allstars.

He was a top sales manager, trainer and recruiter for Vivint and is a business consultant, speaker, trainer and coach for business owners, entrepreneurs and coaches/trainers.

References

External links
Brigham Young Cougars bio

1976 births
Sportspeople from Orem, Utah
American sportspeople of Samoan descent
Players of American football from Utah
BYU Cougars football players
New England Patriots players
Berlin Thunder players
Living people